Renaat Antoon Joseph Van Elslande (born in Boekhoute on 21 January 1916; died in Uccle on 21 December 2000) was a Christen-Democratisch en Vlaams politician who had been culture minister and foreign minister.

Honours 
 War cross
 Minister of State, by royal decree
 Knight Grand Cross in the Order of Leopold II

References

External links 
 Renaat Van Elslande in ODIS - Online Database for Intermediary Structures

1916 births
2000 deaths
Christian Democratic and Flemish politicians
Foreign ministers of Belgium
Members of the Chamber of Representatives (Belgium)
People from Assenede
Recipients of the Grand Cross of the Order of Leopold II
Grand Crosses 1st class of the Order of Merit of the Federal Republic of Germany